Eugene Belden “Gene” Galusha (August 20, 1941 – August 6, 2008) was a Jewish-American part-time actor and full-time narrator who worked for PBS, ESPN, Court TV, Discovery Channel, A&E, ABC, The Learning Channel and NFL Films.

Filmography

As actor
 Stephanie Daley (as Mr. Gilchrist) (2006)
 The West Wing
 Particular Men (1972).

As narrator
 Hunters: The World of Predators and Prey
 Evening at Pops
 Frontline
 The Investigators
 The New Detectives: Case Studies in Forensic Science
 National Geographic Explorer
 Nova
 Masterpiece Theatre
 Mystery!
 The Rockefeller Family and Colonial Williamsburg
 War and Peace in the Nuclear Age (1989)* Iceland River Challenge
 The New Detectives.
 The Longest Hatred: A Revealing History of Anti-Semitism (1991)

Death
According to IMDb, Galusha died from an unspecified form of cancer on August 6, 2008, exactly 2 weeks prior to what would have been his 67th birthday.

References

External links

Official site

American male voice actors
1941 births
2008 deaths
American male television actors
20th-century American male actors